Gadelgareyevo (Ğäźelgäräy) is a rural locality (a village) in Kiyekbayevsky Selsoviet, Burzyansky District, Bashkortostan, Russia. The population was 435 as of 2010. There are 4 streets.

Geography 
Gadelgareyevo is located 34 km west of Starosubkhangulovo (the district's administrative centre) by road. Kutanovo is the nearest rural locality.

References 

Rural localities in Burzyansky District